Niphonympha oxydelta is a moth of the family Yponomeutidae. It is found in Australia and India (what was then Coorg Province, now part of Karnataka).

References

External links
Australian Faunal Directory

Moths described in 1913
Yponomeutidae